HNLMS Groningen (D813) was a destroyer of the . The ship was in service with the Royal Netherlands Navy from 1956 to 1981. The destroyer was named after the Dutch province of Groningen and was the eleventh ship with this name. In 1981 the ship was taken out of service and sold to Peru where it was  renamed Gálvez. The ship's radio call sign was "PACX".

Dutch service history
HNLMS Groningen was one of eight s and was built at the NDSM in Amsterdam. The keel laying took place on 21 February 1952 and the launching on 9 January 1954. The ship was put into service on 12 September 1956.

On 8 June 1977 Groningen, with the frigate , the replenishment ship  and destroyer , visited Leningrad. This was the first Dutch squadron to visit Leningrad in twenty one years.

On 20 January 1981 the vessel was decommissioned and sold to the Peruvian Navy.

Peruvian service history

The ship was put into service on 2 March 1981 where the ship was renamed Gálvez and decommissioned in 1991.

Notes

Friesland-class destroyers
1954 ships
Ships built in Amsterdam
Destroyers of the Cold War